The Cascade Loop Scenic Byway is a  National Scenic Byway and Washington State Scenic and Recreational Highway encircling the North Cascades in the U.S. state of Washington. It follows eight different numbered highways:

US 2 from Everett to Sunnyslope;
US 97 Alternate from Sunnyslope to Chelan;
US 97 from Chelan to Pateros;
SR 153 from Pateros to Twisp;
SR 20 from Twisp to Coupeville;
SR 525 from Coupeville to Mukilteo;
SR 526 from Mukilteo to Everett; and
I-5 in Everett

History

Additional charging stations belonging to city governments, businesses and homeowners were added to the byway's list of electric charging stations in 2017.

The Cascade Loop was designated as a National Scenic Byway on January 19, 2021.

References

External links

Washington State Scenic and Recreational Highways
Tourist attractions in Snohomish County, Washington
Tourist attractions in King County, Washington
Tourist attractions in Chelan County, Washington
Tourist attractions in Okanogan County, Washington
Tourist attractions in Skagit County, Washington
Tourist attractions in Whatcom County, Washington
Tourist attractions in Island County, Washington
U.S. Route 2
U.S. Route 97
Interstate 5
National Scenic Byways